Proprioseiopsis circulus is a species of mite in the family Phytoseiidae.

References

circulus
Articles created by Qbugbot
Animals described in 1973